Amphoricarpos is a genus of flowering plants in the family Asteraceae described as a genus in 1847.

Amphoricarpos is native to Asia Minor, the Caucasus, and the Balkan Peninsula (including Greece).

 Species
 Amphoricarpos autariatus Bjelčić & E.Mayer - Albania, Greece, Bosnia-Herzegovina, Croatia, Serbia, Montenegro
 Amphoricarpos elegans Albov - Republic of Georgia
 Amphoricarpos exsul O.Schwarz - Asia Minor
 Amphoricarpos neumayerianus (Vis.) Greuter - Albania, Greece, Bosnia-Herzegovina, Croatia, Montenegro
 Amphoricarpos praedictus Ayasligil & Grierson - Asia Minor

References

Cynareae
Asteraceae genera